The myotonic goat or Tennessee fainting goat is an American breed of goat. It is characterised by myotonia congenita, a hereditary condition that may cause it to stiffen or fall over when excited or startled. It may also be known as the fainting goat, falling goat, stiff-legged goat or nervous goat, or as the Tennessee wooden-leg goat. Four goats of this type were brought to Tennessee in the 1880s. 

Myotonic goats tend to be less preferred for sustainable meat production.

History 

The myotonic goat is important in history for researching and clarifying the role of chloride in muscle excitation.

Fainting goats were first brought to Marshall County, Tennessee, in the 1880s.

The fainting was first described in scientific literature in 1904, and described as a "congenital myotonia" in 1939. The mutation in the goat gene that causes this muscle stiffness was discovered in 1996, several years after the equivalent gene had been discovered in humans and mice.

The experiments of Brown and Harvey in 1939 with the myotonic goat made a major contribution to the understanding of the physiological basis of this condition and influenced many other theories of myotonia and its causes.

In 2019 its conservation status was listed as "at risk" in the DAD-IS database of the Food and Agriculture Organization of the United Nations.

Characteristics

Body 
Myotonic goats vary heavily in their characteristics in comparison to other goat breeds, and they possess certain traits that other goat breeds do not. Distinctly, their head and body formation tends to be different. Myotonic goats have a wide body, and a heavier mass. The muscle condition of the myotonic goats usually leads to an increased muscle mass with a broader build. Broadness is shown throughout the back and shoulders, due to muscle density.

Head 
They have large, prominent eyes in high sockets that tend to protrude, and are fairly distinct features. They are sometimes called "bug-eyed" for this feature. The heads tend to be medium length with a broad muzzle. Jaws tend to be broad as well, and distinct. The face is usually straight or convex. The ears tend to be normal-sized, and closer to the face. The ears also exhibit a ripple half-way down the length of the ear. The horns tend to run large and have 1-2 inches between. The neck tends to be muscle dense and more round than that of dairy breeds. The skin on many male's necks is wrinkled and thick. The neck can also run horizontally and therefore, the head can be lower.

Personality 
Myotonic goats are vigilant animals that are quieter than other goat breeds. Other important differential characteristics of the myotonic goat include very teachable/trainable, stiffness, high quality adaptation to low-input farm land and foraging, and cross-breeding creating hybrids leading to physical strength and good health.

Coat 
Their hair can be short or long, with certain individuals producing a great deal of cashmere during colder months. Coats can demonstrate any color or pattern.

Cause of "fainting" and additional information 
Myotonia congenita is caused by an inherited disorder of a chloride channel in the muscles of the skeleton (skeletal muscle chloride channel 1, CLCN1). Congenital myotonia can be inherited as an autosomal dominant trait (with incomplete penetrance) or a recessive trait, resulting in the varying severity of the condition. In affected goats, the CLCN1 gene contains a missense mutation; the amino acid alanine is replaced with a proline residue. This small change causes the chloride channel in the muscle fibres to have a reduced conductance of chloride ions. This missense mutation occurs in a sequence of seven amino acids that are included in a group of closely related channels including that of humans and rats. This causes a delay in the relaxation of the muscles after the goat has made an involuntary movement. After stimulation, in myotonia congenita there is an increased tendency of the muscle fibers to respond with repetitive action potentials and after discharges. It has been shown that the increased muscle excitability is largely accounted for by the lack of chloride permeability in these fibers. Myotonia congenita is also characterized by a significant increase in the fast isomyosins in each muscle type. The muscle fibers of the myotonic goat were found to be highly (electrically) resistive, corresponding to the blocking of chloride conductance. In a study, normal goat muscle fibers could be made myotonic by blocking the chloride conductance using myotonia inducing drugs, or by substituting in an anion that is unable to pass through a semi-permeable membrane.

Isolated intercostal muscle from goats with the condition was shown to be significantly different from that of normal goats in terms of the temperature dependence of the resting membrane resistance and potassium efflux. These differences help to explain increases in the severity of myotonia in the whole animal that occurs upon decreasing the temperature of the involved muscles.

It has been observed that there are no abnormalities in percussion responses or stiffness during the first 14 days of a newborn goat's life. The first percussion responses were observed during days 18–143, and the stiffening and/or falling begins to occur during days 20–173.

Relief of symptoms 
Although there is no known treatment for myotonia congenita, in a study testing the effect of hydration on myotonia in goats, it was found that upon depriving goats of water, the myotonic symptoms disappeared within 3 days and returned fully within 2–3 days of water being provided. Previous studies have also reported that taurine, an amino sulphonic acid, when given to myotonic patients can reduce the symptoms of the condition. However, it has been shown that it neither antagonizes the condition, nor prevents it.

Materials and methods 
In order to study myotonia in goats, researchers relied on the isolation of RNA protein. Samples of skeletal muscles and tissue were collected from a normal goat as a control group, and a myotonic goat. The diseased goat in the study showed severe myotonia, demonstrating muscle relaxation issues and severe fainting episodes. They then used a Northern Blot Analysis in which the total RNA was transferred to a nylon membrane and physically explored with antisense RNA probe transcribed from a human. What followed was isolation and cloning of the goat in which cDNA was formulated from myotonic goat skeletal muscle. cDNA synthesis was conducted with a random or gene-specific primer. Products were identified, sub-cloned into plasmids, and sequenced. Next followed the Single-Strand Conformational Analysis, where synthesis was provoked from normal or myotonic goat skeletal muscle. Then they performed mutagenesis and functional expression, where plasmid constructs were transcribed and expressed. The voltages were assessed between -145 mV and +35 mV. Using the Northern Blot Analysis, they verified that the fainting episodes are caused by decreased chloride production in the muscle cell membrane.

In humans 
The myotonic goat is very similar to the condition in humans which is known as congenital myotonia. They are similar in the way that both the human and the goat are not typically consumed by the condition and can more or less lead perfectly normal lives. Similar to goats, in humans the condition is described as a chloride channel disorder known for delayed muscle relaxation, and also caused by mutations in the skeletal muscle chloride channel gene. Also, like the goats, it can range from mild to severe. In an experiment with humans using muscle biopsy, after Periodic acid-Schiff (PAS) staining with diastase digestion, there was PAS positive material within myotonic goat fibers.

Molecular basis 
From the study above, it was found that a change in the nucleotide sequence caused a proline substitution for alanine residue in the carboxyl terminus of the goat's chloride channel. A goat demonstrating the disease had a +47 mV shift in the channel activation, which created less open chloride channels located near the rested membrane of the skeletal muscles, which demonstrates a molecular basis- decreased chloride production in the myotonic muscles.

Origin of fainting goats 
Most all myotonic goats seem to come from an origin in Tennessee, in the 1880s. White and Plaskett reported seeing these goats in five counties in Tennessee: Marshall, Giles, Lawrence, Maury, and Coffee. There were also goats in Texas that were brought over from Giles county in Tennessee, solely for a farmer who claimed to know of the goats existence to prove it as fact to his neighbors. The goats were unable to jump over normal-sized fences, and found holes in the ground to crawl underneath the fences, similar to a hog. This unusual behavior made the goats more desirable in this era, as many farmers used stone walls for fences, therefore containing their goats. In Marshall country, there was also a buck goat brought over from Canada. The A. & M. College in Texas owned a zoo during 1926-1927 in which a myotonic goat was presented. Dr. White (in a letter to the author) stated that in the summer of 1929 in Egypt, he witnessed several fainting goats between the Suez Canal and the Palestine border. He also stated that he shipped some of the goats from Tennessee to a professor by the name of Nagel, at the Nervous Disease Institute in Germany for studies.

The myotonic goat is important in history for researching and clarifying the role of chloride in muscle excitation.

The fainting was first described in scientific literature in 1904, and described as a "congenital myotonia" in 1939. The mutation in the goat gene that causes this muscle stiffness was discovered in 1996, several years after the equivalent gene had been discovered in humans and mice. However, the tendency of goats to spasm has been attested to as early as the Hippocratic Corpus, where analogies are drawn from the phenomenon to human illness. 

The experiments of Brown and Harvey in 1939 with the myotonic goat made a major contribution to the understanding of the physiological basis of this condition and influenced many other theories of myotonia and its causes.

Meat production 
Meat production from goats uses maternal breeds that demonstrate high levels of fitness under non-optimal situations. The Myotonic goat lacks abilities for proper assessment of female fitness. However, 80 Myotonic goats were studied in an experiment, and were compared to traits regarding health and reproduction in Spanish goats, Kiko goats, and Boer goats. The study measured Fecal Egg Count (FEC) and Packed Cell Volume (PCV). Myotonic goats tended to have a lower body mass and a lower FEC, but a greater PCV than Boer goats. Weaning rates, annual kidding rates, doe retention rates and kid crop weaned were relatively the same in all goats except the Myotonic goat. Myotonic goats had the lowest FEC in comparison to the other breeds. These results provoke the idea that Myotonic goats are less preferred for sustainable meat production under non-optimal conditions.

Preserving the breed 
The MGR (Myotonic Goat Registry) believes maintaining the breed is of great significance, and that the breed is much more than just muscular stiffness. Important factors the MGR states to maintain the breed include quiet behavior, parasite resistance, and good mothering ability. Therefore, to protect the Myotonic goat breed, the MGR registers all crossbreeds. This allows for identification of purebred Myotonic goats. Registering the goats allows for reduction in labeling offspring as purebreds if they are not. It has been controversial over the years, as some breeders think crossbreeding should not occur. The main reasons known for continuing to breed these goats have been for the observation of their fainting behavior as well as their ability to be kept in minimally fenced farms due to their lack of desire to jump over anything over 0.5m, as it is an issue for most farmers that most goat breeds try to jump over the fences enclosing them.

References 

Meat goat breeds
Conservation Priority Breeds of the Livestock Conservancy
Goat breeds originating in the United States
Sheep and goat diseases